Milameline (CI-979, PD-129,409, RU-35,926) is a non-selective muscarinic acetylcholine receptor partial agonist with cognition-acting properties that was being investigated for the treatment of Alzheimer's disease, but produced poor results in clinical trials and was subsequently discontinued.

Changing the O-methyl aldoxime to an O-propargyl oxime instead gives a separate molecule called RU 35986.

See also 
 Alvameline
 Sabcomeline
 Tazomeline
 Xanomeline

References 

Muscarinic agonists
Aldoximes
Tetrahydropyridines